Rasboroides rohani, is a species of freshwater cyprinid fish endemic to Sri Lanka where only known from shallow, slow-flowing, shady streams near Suriyakanda in the Walawe River basin. It was scientifically described in 2013, but a comprehensive review in 2018 based on morphometry, meristics and mtDNA disputed its validity, showing that it is a junior synonym of R. pallidus. The occurrence of R. pallidus in the Walawe River basin is not natural, but the result of translocations.

References

Rasboroides
Cyprinid fish of Asia
Endemic fauna of Sri Lanka
Freshwater fish of Sri Lanka
Taxa named by Sudesh Batuwita
Taxa named by Madura de Silva
Fish described in 2013